The 1922 South Londonderry by-election was held on 18 January 1922.  The by-election was held due to the death of the incumbent UUP MP, Robert Chichester who had won a by-election the previous August.  It was won unopposed by the UUP candidate Sir William Hacket Pain.

Hacket Pain retired at the general election in October 1922 when the constituency was merged with others into a larger Londonderry constituency.

References

1922 elections in the United Kingdom
By-elections to the Parliament of the United Kingdom in County Londonderry constituencies
Unopposed by-elections to the Parliament of the United Kingdom (need citation)
20th century in County Londonderry
1922 elections in Northern Ireland